John Hawkins (born c 1611) was an English politician who sat in the House of Commons in 1659.

Hawkins was the son of Henry Hawkins of Ashton Canes, Wiltshire. He matriculated at Oriel College, Oxford on 22 November 1639, aged 18. In 1659, he was elected Member of Parliament for Cricklade in the Third Protectorate Parliament.

References

1611 births
Year of death missing
English MPs 1659
Alumni of Oriel College, Oxford
Year of birth uncertain
Members of the Parliament of England (pre-1707) for Cricklade